Jean-Yves Le Gallou (born 4 October 1948) is a French politician. He served as a member of the European Parliament from 1994 until 1999, representing the National Front. Since 2022, he has been a member of Reconquête.

Career 
Le Gallou began his political career as a member of the Republican Party. In 1974 he joined Yvan Blot in setting up the Club de l'Horloge. As the club developed links with GRECE Le Gallou grew in importance, serving as a bridge between the Nouvelle Droite and mainstream right-wing politics.

Le Gallou grew close to the National Front and helped to develop their préférence nationale policy of the 1980s, which called for welfare, health, education and job provisions to be given to French citizens of autochthonous origins first. He soon joined the party and rose in influence, joining Blot and Bruno Mégret, in developing the party's neo-liberal economic policy. He was one of the 11 FN members elected to the European Parliament in the 1994 election. Meanwhile, Le Gallou became the lover and a close associate of Bruno Mégret and followed him into the National Republican Movement.

In June 2014, Le Gallou, Bernard Lugan and Philippe Conrad co-founded the racialist think tank , which describes itself "in the continuity of Dominique Venner's thought and action". The organization held a colloquium with Renaud Camus, Charlotte d'Ornellas and Jean Raspail in April 2016.

In 2022 he joined Reconquête.

Private life 
In his spare time Le Gallou is a keen mountaineer and has completed a number of traditional races in the Alps. He participates in pagan ceremonies, notably at the summer solstice.

References

External links

1948 births
Living people
Carrefour de l'horloge people
French people of Breton descent
Politicians from Paris
Sportspeople from Paris
French mountain climbers
Sciences Po alumni
École nationale d'administration alumni
MEPs for France 1994–1999
National Rally (France) MEPs
National Republican Movement politicians
French modern pagans
New Right (Europe)
National Rally (France) politicians
French male non-fiction writers
Reconquête politicians